Lisa York may refer to:

Lisa York (actress) (born 1969), English actress
Lisa York (runner) (born 1970), English Olympic athlete